Breed of the Border is a 1924 American silent Western film directed by Harry Garson and starring Maurice 'Lefty' Flynn, Dorothy Dwan, and Louise Carver.

Plot
As described in a film magazine review, Circus Lacy arrives in a border town following the robbery of a mine, finding the father of Ethel Slocum is under suspicion. He protects Slocum from Sheriff Wells and then routes a bully who menaces Ethel. Later he locates the stronghold of the bandits who are led by Red Lucas and captures the leader.

Cast

Preservation
With no prints of Breed of the Border located in any film archives, it is a lost film.

References

External links

 
 

1924 films
1924 Western (genre) films
Films directed by Harry Garson
American black-and-white films
Film Booking Offices of America films
Silent American Western (genre) films
1920s English-language films
1920s American films